Zenjibu-ji is a Shingon Buddhist Temple located in Nankoku, Kōchi, Japan. It is the 32nd temple of the Shikoku Pilgrimage.

History 
According to the temple records, under imperial decree from Emperor Shōmu, the temple hall was created in order to pray for the safety of Gyōki during a sea voyage. Later, Kūkai sensed the hall as a sacred place, and while performing a goma carved Kannon as the honzon of the temple. Due to the shape of the mountain the temple was located on being shaped like the eight-leafed lotus and Mount Potalaka, Kūkai prayed to Akasagarbha, and named the temple Gumonji-in Zenjibu-ji (求聞持院禅師峰寺).

The Honzon is called Funadama Kannon (船魂（ふなだま）の観音 lit. ship spirit Kannon) as it was an area that fishermen would gather in prayer, and used a temple to pray for safe voyage since the rule of Yamauchi Kazutoyo, often prior to departure towards Edo for the sankin-kotai.

References 

Shingon Buddhism
Buddhist temples in Japan
Nankoku, Kōchi
Shikoku region